The 2002 OFC Nations Cup took place in New Zealand, between 5 and 14 July 2002.

The competition was divided into two group stages, with a knockout tournament at the end. Before the tournament, 11 of the nations were seeded according to their 2001 FIFA ranking, while New Caledonia was placed last by default, as it was not a FIFA member.

The six lowest-ranked teams took part in the first stage of qualifying, in which the two highest placed teams at the end of the round-robin stage gained qualification to the second group stage, made up of the six highest-ranked teams. The remaining eight teams were then split into two groups of four, with the top two nations from each group progressing to the knockout stage.

Australia failed to defend the title they won in 2000. They were beaten by New Zealand in the final, with Ryan Nelsen scoring the winning goal.

Qualification
See 2002 OFC Nations Cup qualification.

Venues

Squads
See 2002 OFC Nations Cup squads.

Group stage

Group A

Group B

Knockout stage

Semifinals

Third place match

Final

Goalscorers
5 goals
  Bobby Despotovski
  Joel Porter
  Chris Killen
  Jeff Campbell
4 goals
  Mark Burton
3 goals
  Damian Mori
  Ivan Vicelich
  Ryan Nelsen
  Felix Tagawa
2 goals

  Paul Trimboli
  Scott Chipperfield
  Paul Urlovic

1 goal

  Steve Horvat
  Angelo Costanzo
  Ante Milicic
  Ante Juric
  Fausto De Amicis
  Mehmet Duraković
  Junior Bukaudi
  Veresa Toma
  Andre Sinedo
  Raf de Gregorio
  Joe Aisa
  Reginald Davani
  Commins Menapi
  Henry Fa'arodo
  Patterson Daudau
  Samuel Garcia
  Steve Fatupua-Lecaill
  Sylvain Booene
  Tetahio Auraa
  Teva Zaveroni
  Richard Iwai
  Willie August Marango

External links
 RSSSF Accessed 21 February 2010.

 
2002
2002
Nations
2002 in New Zealand association football
2002 in Australian soccer
July 2002 sports events in New Zealand